The 1976 Masters (officially the 1976 Benson & Hedges Masters) was a professional non-ranking snooker tournament that took place from Monday 26 to Friday 30 January 1976 at the New London Theatre in London, England. 10 players were invited for the competition. Mostly the same players from the 1975 tournament mostly competed but with Dennis Taylor replacing Bill Werbeniuk.

1975 runner-up Ray Reardon beat Graham Miles 7–3 in the final. At the age of 43 years and 114 days he was the oldest winner of the event until Stuart Bingham broke the record winning the title in 2020 aged 43 years and 243 days.

Main draw

Final

Century breaks

None. Highest break: 97  Eddie Charlton

References 

Masters (snooker)
Masters
Masters (snooker)
Masters (snooker)